David Ullman (born 1946) is an international yachtsman, sailboat racer, and sailmaker. Ullman founded Ullman Sails in Newport Beach, California in 1967.

He won the 470 World Championships in 1977, 1978 and 1980, and the Melges 24 World Championships in 2007.

He also won the National Championships in Lido 14 (eight times), Snipe (1973), Thistle, Sabot and Coronado 15.

Besides, Ullman won the gold medal in Snipe at the 1975 Pan American Games and in 1980, the Championship of champions (Jack Brown Trophy) and the U.S. Men’s National Championship (Mallory Cup) 
He is also a five times (1992-1996) winner of the Sir Thomas Lipton Challenge Cup.

Ullman has also won races in the S.O.R.C. class, and is a U.S. Team Racing champion. He formerly coached the U.S. Olympic Sailing Team. Ullman continues to race and coach, and is active in running his international sailmaking business.

Awards
Ullman was named US Sailor of the Year in 1996, and was nominated again in 2007. He was inducted into the National Sailing Hall of Fame in 2016.

Publications
Championship Dinghy Sailing (1978), with Christopher Caswell

References

External links
 Sailing : Multihull Issue Causes Multitude of Problems, Ruch Roberts, June 6, 1988
 Yacht Racing; Race Week Beckons Italian Sailors, Barbara Lloyd, January 17, 1999
 Boating report notebook: Despite Flooding, Illbruck Comes Back, Herb McCormick, December 9, 2001
 Ullman Scores Huge Victory for Future of Brand, June 26, 2013
 Dave Ullman, Melges 24 Worlds, Dave Reed, July 5, 2007 - July/August 2007 issue
 Video interview
 Team Brickhouse Interview with Dave Ullman, December 3, 2009
 Ullman Sails Website

1946 births
470 class world champions
American male sailors (sport)
Living people
Sailmakers
Snipe class sailors
US Sailor of the Year
World champions in sailing for the United States
Sailors at the 1975 Pan American Games
Pan American Games competitors for the United States